ICE-9 is an instrumental album by Susumu Hirasawa.

Its title is an allusion to the 1963 science fiction novel Cat's Cradle.

Track listing

Nice Nice Very Nice

External links
 ICE-9

2005 albums
Susumu Hirasawa albums